Moina belli is a species of crustaceans within the family Moinidae, described by Robert Gurney in 1904. This species lives in waters containing high salinity and other impurities, such as the Makgadikgadi Pans region of Botswana, where the salinity is extremely high.

References

Cladocera
Crustaceans described in 1904
Arthropods of Botswana